

Anadolu Feneri is a historical lighthouse still in use, which is located on the Asian side of Bosphorus' Black Sea entrance in Istanbul, Turkey. Anadolu is the Turkish name for Anatolia. A connecting line between the two lighthouses marks the northern boundary of the Port of Istanbul. The place, where the lighthouse stands, is named Anadolufeneri, which today is a fishermen's village in Beykoz district.

History
François Baron de Tott, a French engineer and military officer of Hungarian origin, who lived some years in Istanbul, reported on the existence of a lighthouse at this location in 1755. During the Crimean War (1853–1856), it became necessary to have lighthouses on both sides of the Black Sea entrance of Bosporus to provide safe navigation for the French and British war ships. The French constructed Rumeli Feneri on the opposite side of the strait and improved the existing lighthouse Anadolu Feneri. Both lighthouses went in service on May 15, 1856. Anadolu Feneri was operated by the French until 1933 when the 100-years concession was cancelled and the Turkish authorities took over. Today, it is maintained by the Coastal Safety Authority of the Ministry of Transport and Communication.

The masonry built tower with a gallery around the lantern room has a conical form. A two-story keeper's house is attached to the tower. Initially, it was lit by kerosene that was later replaced by Dalén light using carbide (acetylene gas). Today, the light source is electricity, however, a butane gas lighting system is also installed for backup purposes.

The lighthouse is listed in Turkey under the code "TUR 014" and its radio call sign is TC2ALH.

Anadolu Feneri, inhabited by a family, is open to public visit as a historical site.

See also

 List of lighthouses in Turkey

References

External links
 Directorate General of Coastal Safety 
 Picture of Anadolu Feneri

Lighthouses completed in 1755
Towers completed in 1755
Tourist attractions in Istanbul
Bosphorus
Lighthouses of the Black Sea
Lighthouses in Istanbul
Beykoz